Aspergillus subnutans is a species of fungus in the genus Aspergillus. It is from the Cervini section. The species was first described in 2016. It has been reported to produce 4-hydroxymellein.

Growth and morphology

A. subnutans has been cultivated on both Czapek yeast extract agar (CYA) plates and Malt Extract Agar Oxoid® (MEAOX) plates. The growth morphology of the colonies can be seen in the pictures below.

References 

subnutans
Fungi described in 2016